Plautdietsch or Mennonite Low German is a Low Prussian dialect of East Low German with Dutch influence that developed in the 16th and 17th centuries in the Vistula delta area of Royal Prussia. The word Plautdietsch translates to "flat (or low) German" (referring to the plains of northern Germany or the simplicity of the language). In other Low German dialects, the word for Low German is usually realised as Plattdütsch/Plattdüütsch  or Plattdüütsk , but the spelling Plautdietsch is used to refer specifically to the Vistula variant of the language.

Plautdietsch was a German dialect like others until it was taken by Mennonite settlers to the southwest of the Russian Empire starting in 1789. From there it evolved and subsequent waves of migration brought it to North America, starting in 1873. In Latin America the first settlement occurred in Argentina in 1877 coming from Russia.

Plautdietsch is spoken by about 400,000 Russian Mennonites, most notably in the Latin American countries of Mexico, Peru, Bolivia, Paraguay, Belize, Brazil, Argentina, and Uruguay, along with the United States and Canada (notably Manitoba, Saskatchewan, and Ontario).

Today, Plautdietsch is spoken in two major dialects that trace their division to what is now Ukraine. These two dialects are split between Chortitza Colony and Molotschna. Today, many younger Russian Mennonites in Canada and the United States speak only English. For example, Homer Groening—the father of Matt Groening (creator of The Simpsons)—spoke Plautdietsch as a child in a Mennonite community in Saskatchewan in the 1920s, but Matt never learned the language.

In 2007, Mexican filmmaker Carlos Reygadas directed the film Stellet Licht (Silent Light), set in a Mennonite community in Chihuahua, Mexico. Most of the film's dialogue is in Plautdietsch, which some of the actors had to learn phonetically. Other parts were played by people of the local community.

Migration history
Plautdietsch speakers today are mostly the descendants of Mennonites who fled from what is today the Netherlands and Belgium in the 16th century to escape persecution and resettled in the Vistula delta. They took with them their Dutch, West Frisian and Dutch Low Saxon dialects, which over time they mixed with East Low German dialects: Werdersch, Nehrungisch and Vistulan. As Mennonites they kept their own (primarily Dutch and Low-German) identity, using Standard Dutch well into the 18th century. At the time of their migration to the Russian Empire, their spoken language resembled the dialects of the region with only some few Dutch elements. Their East Low German dialect is still classified as Low Prussian, or simply Prussian. Russian Mennonites trace their genealogical roots mostly to the Low Countries.

Beginning in the late 18th century, the expanding Russian Empire invited Germans and many from the Kingdom of Prussia, including many Mennonites, to create new colonies north of the Black Sea in an area that Russia had recently acquired in one of the Russo-Turkish Wars. This is now part of Ukraine as well as other countries. Beginning in 1873, many Plautdietsch-speaking Mennonites migrated from the Russian Empire to the United States and Canada.

In 1922, Plautdietsch-speaking Mennonites from Canada started to settle in Mexico, and in 1927 in Paraguay. In the 1930s, Mennonites emigrated mainly from Soviet Ukraine directly to Brazil. The first Mennonite settlement in Bolivia was founded in 1957 by Plautdietsch-speaking Mennonites from Paraguay. Soon, conservative Plautdietsch-speaking Mennonites from Canada, Mexico, and Belize also relocated to Bolivia, settling together. In 1986/7, a settlement was founded in Argentina by Plautdietsch-speaking Mennonites from other Latin American countries. Plautdietsch-speaking Mennonites have also recently begun colonies in the jungle of Peru.

Speaker population and language maintenance

Plautdietsch-speaking communities in Latin America have mostly maintained their language, while also learning Standard German and local languages. In North America, many Mennonites have adopted English as their common language. In Germany, many Mennonites have shifted to Standard German, with only the most conservative fraction maintaining use of the Plautdietsch dialect.

Status
Plautdietsch is primarily a spoken language, and does not have an official orthography. However, there have been attempts to create a written form of the language. One of the main issues facing the development of an official orthography is the variation in pronunciation among various speech communities. Another hindrance to the unification of the language is the fact that most Plautdietsch speaking people are not found in one geographical region, being spread across Canada, The United States, Mexico, Central America and South America. Noteworthy attempts at an orthography include those done by Fast, Reimer, Epp, Loewen, and Heinrichs. Despite the absence of an official orthography, there are quite a few written texts in the Plautdietsch language. A significative example is the Bible, whose New Testament was published in 1987 and the complete version subsequently published in 2005. It shares grammatical and lexical similarities with other varieties of Low German, and in general it is intelligible to other Low German speakers after some acquaintance. On the other hand, it has several developments and sound shifts not found in any other Low German dialect.

Varieties 
Regional differences of the language have developed. This is common in spoken languages that have historically lacked a consistent writing system, and have been carried to territories where other languages prevail. Major differences seem to have originated in the beginning of the 19th century in the two major Mennonite settlements in Ekaterinoslav, also known as Novorossiya, or New Russia, (modern-day Ukraine.) The colonies were Chortitza (Old Colony) and Molotschna (New Colony), as noted above. There was a third variety spoken by Groningen Old Flemish Mennonites in Waldheim, Gnadenfeld and Alexanderwohl, which traced its origin from Przechówko. From Przechówko some moved to Brenkenhoffswalde (Błotnica, Lubusz Voivodeship) and Franztal (Głęboczek), in what is today Poland, where they used to live until 1945. Alexanderwohl Mennonite Church is a Low German Mennonite Church, in Goessel, Kansas, US. Some of the major differences between the two (major) varieties are:

A few other differences sometimes related to this issue are the exact pronunciation of the IPA c sound and words as jenau/jeneiw. According to some studies, those might be due to the level of education of the speaker, as well as the influence of Russian and standard German.

Some Plautdietsch speakers might speak a mixture of both dialects. For instance, those who trace their origin to the Bergthal Colony in New Russia—a daughter colony of the Old Colony—show all the phonetic distinction of the Old Colony version, but drop the final -n as the Molotschna speakers do.

Comparison with related languages
Plautdietsch has a Low German (Low Saxon) base, and as such, it does not show the effects of the High German consonant shift. This distinguished the High German dialects from the Low German dialects and all other Germanic languages. The basic distinctions between High German and Low German are:

Effects of the High German consonant shift

Like Dutch, Frisian and Low German, Plautdietsch only shows the mutation of th into d.

Vowel shifts in various Germanic languages

The Old Colony variety has fronted it to the now vacant .

Unique developments
Not only has Plautdietsch undergone vowel shift, various dialects of Plautdietsch have also had their own shifts.

Vowel lowering

 This shift is still active, as some speakers {including a few from Hague} still retain the older pronunciation.

Vowel unrounding

Diphthongization before g, k, ch [IPA x] and r, with possible loss of r

The deletion of r has been completed in most final positions, after front vowels and before alveolar consonants, but is still retained in the infinitive of verbs, after short vowels, and sometimes after back vowels as seen in the example Huarn, Hieena.

Various other vowel equivalences

  shifted to  before voiced consonants.

Palatalization
An intervocalic  is palatalized as the voiced palatal stop , written gj or dj. (A similar event occurred with English, but not as generalized). Also where German has a palatalization (of the shifted  consonant), Plautdietsch retains the palatalization (of ) even after lowering a front vowel.

Influences and borrowings

German
Most Anabaptists that settled in the Vistula Delta were of Dutch or northern German origins, and were joined by refugees from different parts of Germany and Switzerland, who influenced their developing language. After almost two centuries in West Prussia, German replaced Dutch as church, school and written language and has become a source from where words are borrowed extensively, especially for religious terms. Many of these words show the effects of the High German consonant shift, even though they are otherwise adapted into Plautdietsch phonetics. Compare:

This is the case particularly on nouns made out of verbs. The verb normally shows the unshifted consonant, whereas the noun has a shifted Germanized consonant: schluten, Schluss; bräakjen, Bruch (to close, closure; to break, a break)

Dutch
The first half of the 16th century was the onset of the rule of terror by the Duke of Alba in the Spanish Low Countries during the Dutch Revolt (a.k.a. Eighty Years' War), that was centered on religious freedom for the Protestants. As a result, many Mennonites and Reformed left the country. This continued in the 17th century, when the Dutch Reformed Church became the official religion, being less than indulgent to other types of Protestantism, let alone the types perceived as radical (non-violent, no bearing of arms, no recognition of worldly authorities). In Low German area, they left their language traces in particular at the lower Vistula, around Danzig and Elbląg, and up the river towards Toruń.

The Mennonites for a long time maintained their old language. In Danzig, Dutch as the language of the church disappeared about 1800. As a spoken language, the Mennonites took up the Vistula Low German, the vocabulary of which they themselves had already influenced. As a written language, they took up High German. It was this Vistula Low German or Weichselplatt that the Mennonites took with them and kept while migrating to Russia, Canada and elsewhere.

Old Prussian and Baltic languages

Russian or Ukrainian
Wherever Mennonites settled, they found new foods and other items with which they were not familiar with. When that happened, they took the name that local people used for those items. The following words are of Russian or Ukrainian origin:

English
As Mennonites came into contact with new technology, they often adopted and adapted the names for those technologies. For Mennonites who had settled in North America in the 1870s, all new words were borrowed from English. Even though many of those settlers left for South America only 50 years after their arrival, they kept and sometimes adapted these words into the Mennonite Low German Phonetics:

In particular, words for auto parts are taken from English: hood, fender, brakes (along with the more Low German form Brams), spark plugs (pluralized Ploggen), but also words like peanuts, belt, tax.

Spanish
Plautdietsch speakers living in Spanish-speaking countries use many Spanish words in daily speech, especially in business and communication (telephone, for instance) vocabulary. Two examples of words that are completely adapted into Mennonite Low German are Burra (Mexican Spanish burro, donkey) and Wratsch (Mexican Spanish huarache, sandal). Both have a Low German plural: Burrasch, Wratschen. The pure Low German words Äsel and Schlorr are seldom used in Mexico.

Spelling
The spelling of Plautdietsch has also been controversial. The main criteria for spelling systems have been:
 Spelling should be as phonetic as possible.
 German spelling rules should be applied whenever possible.

One problem has been what letters to use for sounds that do not exist in German, such as the palatal  and  sounds, which are both pronounced and spelled differently in various dialects of Plautdietsch. Old Colony speakers pronounce these sounds by striking the middle of the tongue against the palate. Most Plautdietsch speakers' ears are not accustomed to realize these subtle, if not trivial, differences, and will often confuse one with the other.

When comparing different writers, one must take into account the dialect of that writer. The most famous Plautdietsch writer, Arnold Dyck, wrote in the Molotschna dialect, though his origins were from the Old Colony. During his life, he made many changes in his spelling system. His developments are a basis for the various spellings used today. In the following table, only his final system is taken into account, as used in his famous Koop enn Bua series, along with Herman Rempel (Kjennn Jie noch Plautdietsch?), Reuben Epp (Plautdietsche Schreftsteckja), Jack Thiessen (Mennonite Low German Dictionary), J. J. Neufeld (Daut niehe Tastament) and Ed Zacharias (De Bibel). The latter two claim to write in the Old Colony dialect, as seen in their verb endings, while the other three use the Plautdietsch as spoken by the descendants of the Bergthal Colony, i. e. the Old Colony dialect with a loss of -n endings.

Phonetics
Mennonite Low German has many sounds, including a few not found in other varieties of Low German.

Consonants

Where symbols for consonants occur in pairs, the left represents the voiceless consonant and the right represents the voiced consonant. Observations: According to the spelling system of De Bibel these sounds are spelled as follows:
  –  as in Kjinja ("children")
  –  as in Hunga ("hunger")
  – no letter, but has to be used if a word that begins with a vowel or a prefix is added to a word which by itself starts with a vowel: ve'achten (to despise)
The only criterion is the spelling of these words in German.  is spelled  as in German: Wota ("water")
  – at the beginning of a word and between vowels  is written : sajen ("to say"), läsen ("to read"). The  sound is written  at the beginning of a word (where some speakers pronounce it ),  between vowels and final after a short vowel: Zocka ("sugar"), waussen ("to grow"), Oss ("ox"). At the end of a word after a long vowel or consonant both are written , the reader has to know the word to pronounce the correct sound: Hos  ("rabbit"), Os  ("carrion").
  –  as in Joa ("year"). The  sound is written  after consonants,  and : Erfolch ("success"), Jesecht ("face"), Jewicht ("weight"), läach ("low"). After , it is written  to differentiate it from : rajcht ("right")
  –  is written , only occurs after back vowels: Dach ("day"), Loch ("hole").  (an allophone of ) is rendered  between vowels and final: froagen ("to ask"), vondoag ("today"). At the beginning of a word and before consonants, g has the  sound.
  –  is a flap (like the Spanish r), or depending on the person, even a trill (like Spanish ), before vowels: root ("red"), groot ("big"), Liera ("teacher");  pronounced as an approximant (English r) before a consonant, at the end and in the -ren endings of Old Colony speakers: kort ("short"), ar ("her"), hieren ("to hear"). The uvular German r  is not heard in Plautdietsch.
  –  is an allophone of  that occurs after vowels in words like Baul and well.

Vowels

The vowel inventory of Plautdietsch is large, with 13 simple vowels, 10 diphthongs and one triphthong.

  is rounded and is heard only in the Old Colony and Bergthal groups.
 This table gives only a very general idea of Plautdietsch vowels, as their exact phonetic realizations vary considerably from dialect to dialect, although these differences are poorly documented. Traditionally, Plautdietsch has been said to not have phonemic vowel length.

Pronunciation of certain vowels and diphthongs varies from some speakers to others; the diphthong represented by ee for instances is pronounced  or even  by some.
 English sound equivalents are approximate. Long vowels ä and o do not have a diphthong glide.

Grammar
Low German grammar resembles High German, as the syntax and morphology is nearly the same as High German's. Over the years, Plautdietsch has lost some inflection. It is, however, still moderately inflectional, having two numbers, three genders, two cases, two tenses, three persons, two moods, two voices, and two degrees of comparison.

Articles
Even though Plautdietsch has three genders, in the nominative case it has only two definite articles (like Dutch and Low German); masculine and feminine articles are homophonous. However, masculine and feminine indefinite articles are still different (like German) and thus, the three genders can still be perfectly established. In the oblique case, the masculine has a special definite article, making it once more different from the feminine, which, like the neuter, does not change. In the plural number, all gender identification is lost (as in German, Dutch and Low German); all plural determiners and adjective endings are homophonous with the feminine singular.

 In colloquial speech the indefinite article is reduced practically to a "n", or "ne" if feminine. If used so, there is no case distinction. However, when used as a numeral, meaning "one", the diphthong "ee" is heavily stressed and the oblique form of the masculine gender is used. There is no indefinite plural article; een has no plural.

Some Plautdietsch writers try to use a three case system with the definite articles, without much consistency. The system looks somewhat like this, some might use the dative neuter articles, others might not:

Determiners

All possessives (see under pronouns) are declined like in this way. With the form äa (her/their) an r has to be reinserted before adding endings (äaren, äare).

Nouns
Mennonite Low German nouns inflect into two numbers: singular and plural, three genders: masculine, feminine, and neuter, but only two cases, nominative and oblique. The historical dative and accusative have merged, even though some writers try to maintain a three cases distinction, which has been lost for most speakers, perhaps centuries ago. The oblique case is distinct from the nominative only in 1) personal pronouns: ekj froag am, hee auntwuat mie (I ask him, he answers me) 2) articles and demonstrative and possessive adjectives in the singular masculine gender: de Voda halpt dän Sän (the father helps the son) (observe: nouns are not inflected themselves) and 3) proper names, i. e. traditional Mennonite names: Peeta frajcht Marie-en, Marie auntwuat Peetren (Peter asks Mary, Mary answers Peter)

Plurals
Plural formation is comparatively complex. Three major procedures can be established: 1) through an ending, -a, -en, -s, -sch or none at all; 2) voicing the final devoiced consonant and 3) fronting (and maybe lowering) a back vowel, which might require palatalization of a velar consonant. A given word could have one or two, all or none of these characteristics.

Examples
No ending, no voicing, no vowel fronting: de Fesch de Fesch, daut Schop, de Schop, daut Been, de Been (fish, fishes; sheep, sheep; leg, legs)

Voicing, no ending, no vowel fronting: Frint, Friend; Boajch, Boaj (friend/s, mountain/s)

No ending, no voicing, vowel fronting: Foot, Feet (foot, feet)

Voicing and vowel fronting, no ending: Hoot, Heed (hat/s)

-a ending:

only: Licht, Lichta (light/s)

with voicing:  (picture/s)

with vowel fronting: Maun, Mana (man, men)

with voicing, vowel fronting and palatalization: Kaulf, Kjalwa (calf, calves)

-en ending (the -en, -s and -sch endings have no vowel fronting)

only: Näs Näsen, (nose/s)

with voicing: de Tiet, de Tieden, de Erfoarunk, de Erfoarungen (time/s, experience/s)

Words where a historical r is dropped require it to be reinserted: Däa, Däaren (door/s)
Polysyllabic words with a vocalized r drop the final a: Sesta, Sestren (sister/s)

An unstressed schwa also is dropped: Gaufel, Gauflen (fork/s)

-s ending

This class consists mainly of 1) short masculine and neuter nouns: Baul -s, Oarm -s (ball/s, arm/s)

2) words related with family members: Sän -s, Fru -es, (son/s, woman, women)

and 3) masculine and neuter nouns ending in -el and -en (the latter may drop the n): Läpel, Läpels; Goaden, Goades (spoon/s; garden/s)

-sch ending

This class consists of masculine and neuter polysyllabic nouns ending with -a: de Voda, de Vodasch; daut Massa, de Massasch (father/s, knife, knives)

For someone knowing (High) German, pluralizing is a fairly predictable process, with some exceptions: the -en ending covers pretty much the same words in both languages; the -a ending is the equivalent for the German -er plural, where German has Umlaut, Plautdietsch will have vowel fronting in most cases. The -s and -sch groups are made almost entirely of polysyllabic nouns which in German have no plural ending.

The most problematic words are those with an -e plural ending in German. Although the entire class with no ending is made out of them, many other words are treated differently. For example, the plurals for Stool and Stock (chair and stick) are Steela and Stakja (compare German Stuhl, Stühle; Stock, Stöcke). Since they have their vowels fronted there seems to be no reason for the -a ending. Many others have been moved into the -en class: Jeboot, Jebooten (commandment/s, German: Gebot, Gebote). With some not so common words, there is no certainty about the correct plural, different speakers create them in different ways: the plural of Jesaz (law) could be Jesaza or Jesazen (German: Gesetz, Gesetze).

Possession
The classical genitive is no longer used except in a few relic expressions. Instead, possession is expressed as in many German dialects with the his genitive, i.e. naming the possessor in the oblique case with the possessive adjective and the possessed object: Dän Maun sien Hus (the man's house). With proper nouns, and when the possessor is determined by a possessive adjective, the possessor is in the nominative case instead: Peeta sien Hus (Peter's house); mien Voda sien Hus (my father's house). Very long possessive clauses can be created: Mien Voda seine Mutta äare Mutta es miene Uagrootmutta (my father's mother's mother is my great grandmother).

For inanimate or generalized constructions, the preposition von or a composition are used instead: De Lichta von de Staut/ de Stautslichta (the lights of the city).

Diminutive
The diminutive is formed adding by -kje to the noun: de Jung, daut Jungkje; de Mejal, daut Mejalkje (the boy, the little boy; the girl, the little girl). All diminutive nouns take the neuter gender, with two exceptions: de Oomkje, de Mumkje, two forms used very commonly for mister/man/husband and mistress/woman/wife. These seem to have been created originally as diminutive forms of, respectively, Oom and Mumm (uncle and aunt; cf. German: Oheim/Ohm, Öhmchen/Öhmlein and Muhme, Mühmchen/Mühmlein). Today, they are no longer seen as diminutives and therefore retain their respective masculine and feminine genders.

With nouns ending in t or k, only -je is added; a few nouns ending in kj, an additional s is inserted: de Staut, daut Stautje, daut Buak, daut Buakje; daut Stekj, daut Stekjsje (the (little) city, the (little) book, the (little) piece).

Plural diminished nouns take -s ending: Jungkjes, Mejalkjes; however, if the original plural requires fronting of a back vowel or has an -a ending, these features are retained before adding the diminutive suffix: de Stool, de Steela --> daut Stoolkje, de Steelakjes (chair/s, little chair/s)

Adjectives
Mennonite Low German also shows a rich inflectional system in its adjectives. Although once even richer, simplification has done its work here too, leaving Mennonite Low German with three genders: feminine, masculine and neuter, and two comparison degrees: Comparative and Superlative.

The plural of all genders is identical to the feminine singular.

Strong and weak neuter declension: after the definite article daut or the demonstratives daut and dit (neuter form of that, this) the t is dropped and a form identical to the feminine and plural is used. In other situations, as with indefinite articles, possessive adjectives or without article, the strong form is used.

The oblique is used only in the masculine singular. However, if a preposition-article compound is used with a neuter noun, then the oblique would be used. Example: em grooten Hus, but: en daut groote Hus, en een grootet Hus.

There is no predicate form for the superlative, a preposition-article compound with the oblique or weak neuter is used: aum woamsten, or: oppet woamste, or newly just the neuter form without preposition: daut woamste: Zemorjes es et woam, opp Meddach woat et woama, no Meddach es et aum woamsten/ oppet woamste/ daut woamste (in the morning it is warm, at noon it is getting warmer, after noon it is the warmest).

The predicate form is used in predicate sentences for all genders: De Maun es oolt, de Fru es oolt, daut Hus es oolt (the man is old, the woman is old, the house is old).

Numerals

Observation: the numeral eent (one) is declined like the indefinite article (masculine een [oblique eenen], feminine eene, neuter een) or a demonstrative or possessive pronoun (eena [oblique eenen], eene, eent for the respective genders); when counting, the neuter form eent is used.

The ordinal for 11th and 12th are: alfta, twalfta; from 13 to 19 use the ordinal + da: drettieenda (13th) ; from 20 to 99 use the ordinal + sta: fiew un twintichsta (25th). All ordinal numbers are declined like an adjective, the forms given here are masculine nominative.

The partitive numbers for 1/10, 1/11, 1/12 are een Tieedel, een Alftel, een Twalftel, for 13–19 add -del to the ordinal number, for 20–99 add -stel.

Pronouns

Personal pronouns

Some pronouns have two forms, different persons may use one or other form, or even alternate between them. Daut is used at the beginning of a sentence, but may be replaced by et in other positions.

Possessive adjectives are of the masculine (nominative case) or neuter gender. Otherwise, they are declined like the indefinite article and determiners (see under article section).

Demonstrative pronouns

Demonstrative pronouns are frequently used instead of the personal pronouns. When used so, some people use special oblique forms for feminine and plural. When used strictly demonstrative, only the singular masculine has a special oblique form.

Verbs
Mennonite Low German verbs have six tenses. The present and first past tenses are inflected, while the second and third past and both future tenses are different words marked by auxiliary verbs. Verbs can have two moods: Declarative and Imperative, two voices: active and passive, and three persons:1st pers. sing., 2nd pers. sing., 3rd pers. sing., and plural.

Weak verbs
The basic conjugation pattern is as follows:

To determine the stem, take the infinitive and drop the -en ending. There are a few modifications to this basic pattern: 1) If the stem ends with a plosive or fricative voiced consonant (d, g, j, soft s, w, zh), that consonant is devoiced in the 2nd and 3d persons of the present, since voiceless t and st automatically force the preceding consonant (compare the sound of the letter d in English lived and liked). 2) If the stem ends with a voiceless consonant (ch, f, jch, k, kj, p, hard s, sch, t) that consonant devoices the d, sd, d, den endings of the past tense (into t, st, t, ten) for the same reason. 3) If the stem ends with two consonants, the second one being a nasal or lateral, a schwa e is inserted to ease pronunciation. 4) Verbs with a diphthong and r have a special treatment; the r is dropped before endings are attached, and the st/sd of the second person is replaced by scht/zhd.

Examples of a regular verbs: spälen (to play), lachen (to laugh), läwen (to live), odmen (to breathe) and roaren (to cry). The first one follows strictly the basic pattern, the others show the various adjustments needed as described above.

If the inverted word order is used, the -en ending of the plural wie, jie (but not see) form is dropped, and a root-only form, identical to the 1st person singular, is used.

Strong verbs
As in English and Dutch, some verbs have a vowel change in past tense and past participle. As in German, some verbs might have a vowel change in second and third person of the singular in present tense as well. A few verbs that are strong in German are weak in Plautdietsch, but many German weak verbs are strong in Plautdietsch. However, when compared with Dutch and English, those are strong, too.

GENERALITIES: Vowel changes in present tense are somewhat predictable: long ie and u change into short i; long ä/o change into e or a; diphthongs äa and oa are simplified to a.

The first and third person of the past tense are identical (as in weak verbs).

With only a few exceptions (like the verb sajen), all voiced consonants are devoiced in the three persons of the singular past, the nasal ng and nj are retained in second person, but devoiced in first and third person.

The past tense has the same vowel through all persons.

If there is a vowel change from ä to e or a in the present tense, that feature is retained in the singular imperative.

The plural form for wie/jie in the inverted word order keep the final consonant voiced.

Auxiliary, modal and anomalous verbs
A small groups of verbs are more irregular: the auxiliaries sennen and haben, the modal verbs, and a few verbs that originally were monosyllabic and with time have evolved a -nen ending:

Participles
The present participle, formed of the infinitive plus a -t ending, is not often used. It appears in idiomatic expressions like aunhoolent bliewen (to persist), and in a few adjective forms, which have to be inflected for number, gender and case, the -t is voiced into -d: koaken, koakendet Wota (to boil, boiling water).

The past participle of weak verbs is formed with je- plus the stem of the verb plus -t. A voiced consonant is devoiced to go along with t, the inserted e between double consonant is retained, the r after a long vowel is dropped. For the weak verbs given above the past participles are: jespält, jelacht, jejäft, jeodemt, jeroat.

The past participle for strong and anomalous verbs is hard to predict, they could be formed in five or six different ways:
 some are like the weak verbs: jejäft, jesajcht (given, said);
 others are formed of je- plus infinitive: jestonen (stood);
 some, including modal verbs, of je- plus first person past tense: jehaut; jesocht, jekunt (had, sought, been able);
 others of je- plus plural past: jefungen (found);
 Those with an ee or oo in past tense are simplified to ä/o: jeschräwen, jedonen (written, done)
 the past participle of sennen is jewast (been)

Adjectives are frequently made from the past participle by attaching an adjective inflection ending and voicing the final t; if the preceding consonant is voiced, with -en participles the e is dropped:

 (to draw, drawn, a drawn picture)

koaken, jekoakt, eene jekoakte Ieedschock (to boil, boiled, a boiled potato)

stälen, jestolen, een jestolna Hunt (to steal, stolen, a stolen dog)

Compound tenses
Except for the present and simple past, all other tenses are constructed with the aid of the auxiliary verbs sennen, haben, woaren:

Some intransitive verbs take sennen instead of haben as auxiliary verbs if they: 1) indicate a motion from one place to another, or 2) indicate a change of condition, or 3) the verbs sennen (to be) and bliewen (to keep being, to remain). Example: ekj sie jekomen, ekj sie oolt jeworden, ekj sie jewast (I have come, I have become old, I was).

Expressions relating to future plans
In some communities of Plautdietsch speakers, the religious prohibition of James 4:13-14 is interpreted to proscribe the simple use of the first person in talking about future plans or efforts. In such communities it is considered proper to use a softening introductory phrase such as "Ekj proove," (I try, or will try, or alternately I will want to) to avoid giving offense.

Prepositions
Plautdietsch preposition inventory is rich. Some of the most common:
 aun, on, in: de Klock henjt aun de Waunt (the clock is hanging on the wall)
 äwa, over, about
 besied, beside, next to
 bie, by, at
 bowa, over
 buta, except, besides
 derch, through
 en, in
 fa, for
 hinja, behind
 hinjaraun, following something else
 jäajen, against
 mank, among
 met, with
 no, to, after
 onen, without
 opp, on
 to, to
 tweschen, between (twixt)
 unja, under
 ver, in front of
 von, of (relative to)

Syntax
Mennonite Low German shows similarity with High German in the word order. The basic word order is subject–verb–object as in English. Indirect objects precede direct objects as in English John gives Mary a present, but that is where similarities end. A dependent verb, i.e. an infinitive or past participle, comes at the end of the sentence where in English it would be placed immediately after the main verb, as shown in the following examples:

Mennonite Low German word order: Jehaun haft dän Desch jemoakt (John has the table made).
English word order: John has made the table.

Mennonite Low German, like High German, has been referred to as verb-second (V2) word order. In embedded clauses, words relating to time or space can be placed at the beginning of the sentence, but then the subject has to move after the main verb to keep that verb in second position. This pattern is demonstrated here:

Mennonite Low German word order: Nu sie ekj schaftich. More Examples: Dan jeef de Kjennich seine Deena eenen Befäl. (Then the king gave his servants an order)

Also, effects tend to be placed last in the sentence. Example: En daut Kuffel wia soo väl Wota, daut et äwarand (In the cup, there was so much water, that it overflowed).

Mennonite Low German has syntactic patterns not found in High German, or at least not as often, such as the repetition of a subject, by a pronoun.
Example: Mien Hoot dee haft dree Akjen. My hat it has three corners.

Questions, orders and exclamations have a verb first word order: Hast du daut oole Hus aun de fefte Gauss jeseenen? (Have you seen the old house on fifth street?). All questions are arranged like this. There is no auxiliary verb to form questions. If there is a question word, that word precedes the verb: Wua es dien Voda jebuaren (Where is your father born?). As in English, when using verbs in the imperative mood, it is not necessary to specify the person addressed, but it can be added for emphasis: Brinj (du) mie emol dän Homa (Please, (you,) bring the hammer to me). The word emol is frequently asked to soften the order as a word for please. Example of an exclamation: Es daut vondoag oba kolt! (Is it cold today!).

Dependent clauses
As in High German, in dependent clauses, the verb goes at the end:

Ekj well morjen miene Mutta besieekjen, wan ekj Tiet hab. (I want to visit my mother tomorrow if I have time). Observe the construction of: if I have time.

However, when a dependent clause has an infinitive or past participle, this rule is no longer strictly applied; there is a strong tendency to move the finite (main) verb before the infinitive or participle, the direct object (or even a long circumstantial complement):

Example: German word order requires a sentence structure like: Hee fruach mie, auf ekj miene Mutta jistren daut Jelt jejäft haud. (Translation: He asked me if I had given the money yesterday to my mother.) Even though this sounds right and perfectly understandable, most speakers would rearrange these same words as follows: Hee fruach mie, auf ekj miene Mutta jistren haud daut Jelt jejäft. Another example: Hee sajcht, daut sien Brooda jrod no de Staut jefoaren es/ Hee sajcht, daut sien Brooda jrod es no de Staut jefoaren (He says that his brother has just gone to the city). Observe: the verb precedes a prepositional phrase, but an adverb is still placed before it.

Text sample

The Lord's Prayer in Plautdietsch, another form of Low German and Dutch.

See also
 Russian Mennonite (speakers of Plautdietsch all around the globe)
 East Low German
 Gronings dialect
 Low Prussian dialect
 Plautdietsch-Freunde (German NGO, worldwide documentation and promotion of Plautdietsch)
 Silent Light, film by Carlos Reygadas
 Pennsylvania German language
 Hutterite German (not closely related linguistically, but also used primarily by an Anabaptist group)

Notes

Literature

Dictionaries
 Neufeld, Eldo: Plautdietsch-English, English-Plaudietsch, Munich 2005.
 Rempel, Herman: Kjenn Jie Noch Plautdietsch? A Mennonite Low German Dictionary, PrairieView Press, 1995. .
 Thiessen, Jack: Mennonite Low German Dictionary / Mennonitisch-Plattdeutsches Wörterbuch, University of Wisconsin, 2003. .
 Zacharias, Ed Ons Ieeschtet Wieedabuak, 2009. .

Grammars
 Neufeld, Eldo: Plautdietsch Grammar, 72 pages, Munich 2010.
 Siemens, Heinrich: Plautdietsch — Grammatik, Geschichte, Perspektiven, Bonn 2012.

Further reading

References
 
 De Bibel, Kindred Productions, 2003. .
 De Smet, Gilbert: "Niederländische Einflüsse im Niederdeutschen" in: Gerhard Cordes and Dieter Möhn (eds.), Handbuch zur niederdeutschen Sprach- und Literaturwissenschaft, Berlin: Erich Schmidt Verlag, 1983. , pp. 730–761.
 Epp, Reuben: The Story of Low German & Plautdietsch, Reader's Press, 1996. .
 Epp, Reuben: The Spelling of Low German and Plautdietsch, Reader's Press, 1996. .
 McCaffery, Isaias. Wi Leahre Plautdietsch: A Beginner's Guide to Mennonite Low German, Mennonite Heritage Museum, 2008. .

External links

 Was ist Plautdietsch (in Low German)
 Plautdietsch-Freunde e.V. (Germany based NGO, worldwide documentation and promotion of Plautdietsch)
 Opplautdietsch.de - Plautdietsch Radio e.V. Detmold, Germany
 Plautdietsch.ca - written and audio resources 
 Dialect Literature and Speech, Low German from the Global Anabaptist Mennonite Encyclopedia
 Pennsylvania German vs Plautdietsch among Mennonites
 Plautdietsch lexicon with English-Plautdietsch index and category tree (thesaurus)
 German to Plautdietsch, Plautdietsch to German and Russian to Plautdietsch online Dictionary (Author Waldemar Penner)
 Peter Wiens - a German Plautdietsch blogger
 Plautdietsch-copre.ca - Free Plautdietsch books in PDF form
 Plautdietsch verb conjugations

 
Low German
German dialects
Germanic languages
Diaspora languages
Mennonitism
Languages of Bolivia
Languages of Canada
Languages of Germany
Languages of Mexico
Languages of Paraguay
Languages of Russia
Languages of Ukraine
Languages of Uruguay
German language in the United States
Languages of Belize
Languages of Brazil
Languages of Peru